The Lynwood Theatre is a moviehouse in Bainbridge Island, Kitsap County, Washington.  The theatre specializes in showcasing independent and foreign films.

It opened on July 3, 1936. It was the first theatre on Bainbridge Island to show "talkies."  The founders of the Lynwood Theatre, Edna and Emmanuel Olson, wanted to provide a modern alternative to the silent-picture cinemas which existed on Bainbridge Island in 1936. Operating with only one screen, the Lynwood Theatre shows independent and foreign films which rarely get played at large, mainstream multiplexes.  

The Lynwood Theatre is located at 4569 Lynwood Center Road in Bainbridge Island.

External links

Cinemas and movie theaters in Washington (state)
Bainbridge Island, Washington
Buildings and structures in Kitsap County, Washington